The Raj Bhavan of  Puri in the Indian state of Odisha, is an official residence of the governor of Odisha. it was originally built as a summer residence for the erstwhile lieutenant-governor of the Province of Bihar and Odisha under the British Raj.

Location

History
The residence was subsequently used by British governors to escape the summer heat in Patna, which was then the capital of Bihar and Odisha. After Odisha became a separate province in 1936, the building became the residence of the state Governor of Odisha. However, because of the distance from the capital the residence shifted there in 1942. While the new residence in Cuttack was under construction, the Raj Bhavan at Puri underwent remodelling at a cost of Rs. 158,000 to "make it suitable and comfortable for the imperial dignity of His Majesty's representatives in India" with improvements including rewiring, updating of the plumbing system and the creation of a garden.
The building remained in use as the summer residence for governors until 1973, then in 1983 part of the grounds were sold off for the construction of a hotel to boost state tourism.

References

External links

Governors' houses in India
Government of Odisha
Puri
1914 establishments in British India
Buildings and structures in Odisha
Houses completed in 1914
20th-century architecture in India